Jonathan Morrell is an English presenter and journalist who is the Executive Producer at the BBC.

He is a graduate of the media department at the University of Sunderland and has previously worked freelance at: BBC Radio Newcastle (1990–1994), BBC Radio Cleveland (1994–1996), Sky News (1997, 2002–2004), ITV Yorkshire's Calendar (2001), ITV News Channel (2002–2004) and Wellbeing Channel (2001).

He has worked for ITV Tyne Tees on and off as a continuity announcer and then newsreader, since 1990, and in 1996 joined the newsroom as a bulletin editor and then reporter/presenter. In 2004 however he joined full-time, mainly covering for the ill Mike Neville in 2005, as one of the many presenters at the station. His role as a presenter was made more permanent as he became co-presenter of the new North edition of ITV News Tyne Tees in January 2006, following the departure of Mike, initially alongside Pam Royle and from September 2006 with Philippa Tomson.

In 2007, he joined Real Radio (formerly Century FM) as a presenter of the mid-morning show on the North East radio service. He could be heard 10:00–14:00 from Monday to Friday and 10:00–13:00 each Sunday.

In December 2008, it was announced that Morrell would leave as part of a round of job cuts at ITV Tyne Tees. He presented his final programme for the station on Thursday 17 December 2008.

On 2 September 2011 after five years at Real Radio, Morrell presented his final show, quitting both radio and TV presenting in the UK.

Morrell emigrated to Perth, Western Australia where he presented the early breakfast on 720 ABC Perth owned by ABC Local Radio. 
In his spare time, Jonathan produces and presents an 80s Rewind Music Show for a number of stations around the UK and in Europe.

Morrell struggled with depression for many years and was diagnosed with cyclothymia after moving to Australia.

Jonathan was a producer on Perth's Channel 7 for the evening news show. In September 2014 Morrell launched UKWA Perths British radio station www.ukwaradio.com an online and FM station for expats in Perth and Western Australia. 

In 2015 he revealed that coming out as gay cost him employment opportunities.

Morrell returned to the UK in November 2015 and joined BBC Wiltshire to present its daily mid-morning show.

In 2018 Morrell was appointed chairman of Pride Community Network and opened the Pride Media Centre, which includes a radio station, at a former BBC television studio in Gateshead, UK.

References

External links
Interview at icnewcastle
Jonathan Morrell at Real Radio
Jonathan Morrell on Twitter
  Penwith Radio

Alumni of the University of Sunderland
Living people
British reporters and correspondents
ITV regional newsreaders and journalists
People with bipolar disorder
Year of birth missing (living people)
English LGBT people
British LGBT journalists